Germany's Alexander Zverev defeated Karen Khachanov of the Russian Olympic Committee in the final, 6–3, 6–1, to win the gold medal in Men's Singles tennis at the 2020 Summer Olympics. It was both countries' first medals at the event since 2000, and Germany's first victory. In the bronze medal match, Spain's Pablo Carreño Busta defeated Serbia's Novak Djokovic, 6–4, 6–7(6–8), 6–3. En route to his bronze medal, Carreño Busta defeated both top 2 ranked players - ROC's Daniil Medvedev and Djokovic.

64 players from 31 nations competed.

Andy Murray was the two-time reigning gold medalist, but withdrew before his first-round match due to a quadriceps strain.

World No. 1-ranked Djokovic was attempting to win the fourth of five components of a potential Golden Slam (and the third man to do so after Andre Agassi and Rafael Nadal), having already won the Australian Open, French Open and Wimbledon Championships that year, but he lost to Zverev in the semifinals.

The medals for the competition were presented by Nenad Lalović, IOC Executive Board Member; Serbia; and the medalists' bouquets were presented by David Haggerty, ITF President; United States.

Background
This was the 16th (medal) appearance of the men's singles tennis event. The event has been held at every Summer Olympics where tennis has been on the program: from 1896 to 1924 and then from 1988 to the current program. Demonstration events were held in 1968 and 1984.

Novak Djokovic was the favourite entering the tournament having won three consecutive Grand Slam titles earlier in the year. Top players not present, along with two-time defending champion Andy Murray, included Roger Federer, Rafael Nadal, Matteo Berrettini, Dominic Thiem, Roberto Bautista Agut, and Stan Wawrinka.

Egypt made its men's singles debut. France made its 15th appearance, most among all nations, having missed only the 1904 event.

Qualification

Each National Olympic Committee (NOC) can enter up to four players. Nations had been limited to four players in the event since the 2000 Games. Qualification for the men's singles is primarily through the ATP ranking list of 7 June 2021. An additional restriction is that players had to have been part of a nominated team for three Davis Cup events between 2017 and 2020 (with some exceptions). There are 64 quota places available for men's singles.

The first 56 are assigned through the world ranking.

There are six places available through continental qualification: four through continental tournaments (two in the 2019 Pan American Games, one in the 2018 Asian Games, and one in the 2019 African Games) and two through continent-restricted world ranking (one each for Europe and Oceania, which must come from NOCs with no other qualified competitors). The four continental tournament places take precedence over the world ranking, so the winners (João Menezes, Marcelo Tomás Barrios Vera, Denis Istomin, and Mohamed Safwat) are not counted toward the 56 (but are counted toward the four-per-nation limit).

One place is guaranteed to the host nation. If Japan earns a place through the world ranking, the host guarantee is not used and a 57th place is added to the ranking.

In an unusual career accomplishment qualification process, one spot is reserved for a former Olympic or Grand Slam champion that has not qualified through the current world rankings. The player must have won an Olympic gold medal or a Grand Slam singles final, be within the top 300 ranked players, and be from a nation that has not already qualified four players. If multiple players meet those criteria, the one with the most titles qualifies; if still tied, the highest ranked player qualifies. If no players meet those criteria, an additional place (57th or 58th) is added to the ranking. For the 2020 Games, this 'career wild card' quota was initially held by reigning double Olympic champion and three-time Grand Slam winner Andy Murray, but he was given a direct entry after several players withdrew. However he withdrew before he was due to play his first round match due to an injury.

Competition format

The competition was a single-elimination tournament with a bronze medal match. Matches were best-of-3 sets. A tiebreak was played in all sets reaching 6–6, including the last set of a match.
In a change from previous Olympics editions, the men’s final was played over three rather than five sets, for compensation to players who are competing in the later stages in all three categories: singles, doubles and mixed.

Schedule
The competition is held over nine days from 24 July to 1 August. Times given are the start of tennis sessions, though the men's singles shares courts with other tennis events.

All times are Japan Standard Time (UTC+9)

Seeds

Draw

Finals

Top half

Section 1

Section 2

Bottom half

Section 3

Section 4

References

External links
Draw 

Tennis at the 2020 Summer Olympics
Men's events at the 2020 Summer Olympics